Russian cube may refer to:
 Rubik's Cube, a 3-D mechanical puzzle
 Tetris, a puzzle video game